The non-governmental organization American Capital of Culture Organization selects one city in the Americas annually to serve as the American Capital of Culture for a period of one year. The organization claims the initiative is based closely on the European Capital of Culture program; it enjoys the backing of the Organization of American States, but the OAS is not involved in the selection process.

The organization was founded in 1998 with the objectives to raise awareness of culture in the Americas and to promote the city selected as the Capital of Culture for the year. The chosen city is publicized on the television networks Antena 3 and the Discovery network.

List of dates of American Capital of Culture

See also

References

External links 
 American Capital of Culture

Culture of the Americas